John Wiese (born April 18, 1977) is an American noise musician and visual artist based in Los Angeles, California. Wiese has released much of his material on his own Helicopter label. 

He graduated from the California Institute of the Arts in 2001 with a BFA in Graphic Design.  

Wiese is a member of the group Sissy Spacek.

Partial discography

Solo albums 

 Collected Tracks (2000)
 Light Of A Ghost (2005)
 Magical Crystal Blah Volume 2 (2005)
 Tumbler (2006)
 Black Magic Pond (2006)
 Soft Punk (2007)
 Inescapable Conclusion (2007)
 Dramatic Accessories (2008)
 Circle Snare (2009)
 Rotture (2007) / Gunfire (2009)
 GGA (2011)
 100 Seven Inch Records by John Wiese (2011)
 Seven Of Wands (2011)
 Deviate From Balance (2015)
 Escaped Language (2017)

References

External links 
    
 

1977 births
American electronic musicians
Living people
American noise musicians
People from Fort Leavenworth, Kansas
American experimental musicians
Musicians from Kansas
California Institute of the Arts alumni
21st-century American artists
Artists from Kansas